Heilles-Mouchy is a railway station located in the commune of Heilles in the Oise department, France. The station is served by TER Hauts-de-France trains from Creil to Beauvais.

References

Railway stations in Oise